Mohamed Barakat Ahmed Bastamy (born 7 September  1976) is a retired Egyptian footballer. A right-footed playmaker, Barakat usually played as an offensive right winger or attacking midfielder for Egyptian club Al Ahly and the Egyptian National Team. He is considered by many as one of the most talented players in Africa. Barakat's hallmarks are surging runs from midfield which often disrupt opposing defences, as well as his box-to-box work ethic, which makes him an important figure both in defence and attack. Thanks to his noticeable achievements and talent, his fans have given him the nickname The Mercurial, He reached his peak in 2005 and 2006, helping his club Al Ahly to win the CAF Champions League 2005 and CAF Champions League 2006 and Egypt win their fifth African Cup of Nations Egypt 2006. However, in 2006 his career was marred by a long spell of injuries.

Club career

Early career
Barakat began his career at unheralded Sekka but really found his feet when he joined Al-Ismaily – just about the only club in Egypt with the ability to stand up to the 'big boys' of Al Ahly and Zamalek.

Gulf Countries
The 2002 Egyptian Footballer of the Year has joined Ahly Jeddah in Saudi Arabia. He helped the later win 2003 Arab Club Championship. Barakat scored twice in that tournament; including the Final winner goal. and then going to Alarabi in Qatar.

Al Ahly
Barakat returned to Egypt in 2004 to join Al Ahly. Some have commented that the combination with Mohamed Aboutrika and Emad Moteab formed the most formidable triangle in African Soccer, and they were given the moniker of "The Bermuda Triangle".

Mohamed Barakat won the BBC African Footballer of 2005 award ahead of Cameroon's Samuel Eto'o and Obafemi Martins of Nigeria. More than 15,000 voted for him. He was also named the best player in Africa's continental club competition by the African Football Association for the same year, as he scored 7 goals in the CAF Champions League 2005.
Barakat started the season of 2013 with some bad performances, but after sometime he got back to his perfect form and scored in the CAF Super Cup 2013 the winning goal, which led Al Ahly to win the cup. After he played a match against Benzarty match in CAF Champions League 2013 and scored a goal from a penalty, he also made an assist to Emad Meteb. Two weeks later there were rumors of his retirement and Barakat admitted he was thinking of retiring because he is 37 years old. After with two days Barakat scored two goals against Enpii in the Egyptian league from a penalty and a shot. People all thought and said Barakat still has one or two seasons ahead after that amazing performance and goals and that he looked like he was eighteen while playing even though he is 37, but unfortunately three weeks after, Barakat announced that he was going to retire at the end of this season, putting an end to the career.

Retirement
After the Port Said Stadium clashes, on 1 February 2012, Barakat decided to retire from professional football, along with Emad Motaeb and Mohamed Aboutrika. However, he reversed his decision and returned to Al Ahly once again.

International career
Barakat made his debut for the Pharaohs in June 2000 against South Korea. He played 4 matches in 2002 African Cup of Nations and all Egypt's matches in 2006 Africa Cup of Nations.
Barakat ended his international career on 18 November 2009 after his dream to reach the 2010 FIFA World Cup was crashed by Algeria that won 1–0, he told the press about that discussion on 11 August 2010.

International goals
Source:

Honours and achievements

Club
Ismaily
 Egyptian Premier League: 2001–02
 Egypt Cup: 2000

Al Ahli Saudi
 Arab Unified Club Championship: 2002

Al Ahly
 Egyptian Premier League: 2004–05, 2005–06, 2006–07, 2007–08, 2008–09, 2009–10, 2010–11
 Egypt Cup: 2006, 2007
 Egyptian Super Cup: 2005, 2006, 2007, 2008, 2010, 2011
 CAF Champions League: 2005, 2006, 2008, 2012, 2013
 CAF Super Cup: 2006, 2007, 2009, 2013

International
Egypt
 African Cup of Nations: 2006

Individual

Awards
 BBC African Footballer of the Year: 2005
 African Inter-Club Player of the Year: 2005
 CAF Team of the Year: 2005

Performances
 CAF Champions League top goalscorer: 2005 (Shared with Joetex Frimpong)

References

External links
 Egyptian Barakat wins BBC award
 Egypt's outstanding Pharaoh
 Barakat named the best player in Africa's continental club competition

Egyptian footballers
Egyptian expatriate footballers
Egypt international footballers
1976 births
Al Ahly SC players
Association football midfielders
Ismaily SC players
Living people
2002 African Cup of Nations players
2004 African Cup of Nations players
2006 Africa Cup of Nations players
Al-Arabi SC (Qatar) players
Expatriate footballers in Qatar
Footballers from Cairo
Al-Ahli Saudi FC players
Saudi Professional League players
Qatar Stars League players
Egyptian Premier League players
Expatriate footballers in Saudi Arabia
Egyptian expatriate sportspeople in Saudi Arabia
Egyptian expatriate sportspeople in Qatar